Volker Dietrich was an East German bobsledder who competed in the late 1980s. He is best known for his finishes in the 1987-8 Bobsleigh World Cup season, finishing second in the two-man event and third both in the combined men's and four-man events.

References
List of combined men's bobsleigh World Cup champions: 1985-2007
List of four-man bobsleigh World Cup champions since 1985
List of two-man bobsleigh World Cup champions since 1985

German male bobsledders
Living people
Year of birth missing (living people)